Jargo is a 2004 coming of age film about a young man who experiences culture shock from moving from Saudi Arabia to Germany. The film premiered at the Berlin International Film Festival and won two awards at the Sarajevo Film Festival. It was directed by Maria Solrun.

Plot
The film is about a young man, Jargo (Constantin von Jascheroff), who is of German descent but has resided in Saudi Arabia with his parents. After his father (Udo Kier) commits suicide, Jargo and his mother move to Berlin. Jargo experiences culture shock, as he is alienated from German culture. He meets a similar aged companion, Kamil (Oktay Özdemir), a working-class youth of Turkish origin. Kamil is a petty criminal, who attracts Jargo, upon whom he comes to have a significant influence. Kamil is passionately in love with his substance-abusive girlfriend, played by Nora Waldstätten, whose fickleness and instability eventually lead to a crisis between Jargo and Kamil.

External links

Official Website of the production company
Official Website of debut
Official Website of the Berlin International Film Festival

2000s coming-of-age drama films
2004 films
Films directed by Maria Solrun
Films set in Berlin
German coming-of-age drama films
2000s German-language films
2004 drama films
2000s German films